The 1990–91 Australian region cyclone season was a slightly below average cyclone season, with ten tropical cyclones occurring within the region between 90°E and 160°E. The season officially ran from November 1, 1990, to April 30, 1991, with the first disturbance of the season forming on 10 December and the last disturbance moving out of the region during 11 May. Six people were killed by Cyclone Joy when it made landfall on Australia. During the season, tropical cyclones were monitored by the Australian Bureau of Meteorology, who ran Tropical Cyclone Warning Centers (TCWC) in Perth, Darwin, and Brisbane. The United States Joint Typhoon Warning Center (JTWC) and Papua New Guinea National Weather Service also monitored systems within the basin during the season. The JTWC designated systems with a number and either a S or a P suffix depending on which side of 135E. The Bureau of Meteorology and Papua New Guinea national Weather Service both used the Australian Tropical Cyclone Intensity Scale, and estimated windspeeds over a ten-minute period, while the JTWC estimated sustained winds over a one-minute period and are comparable to the Saffir–Simpson Hurricane Scale.

Seasonal summary

Systems

Tropical Cyclone Laurence 

On 8 December, a cluster of clouds developed over the Timor sea and moved towards the south-east, following a large scale mid-latitude forcing event. During 10 January as the low became detectable on Darwin's radar, TCWC Darwin reported that the low had developed into a category one tropical cyclone and named it Laurence while reporting that the cyclone had reached its 10-minute peak intensity of 65 km/h (40 mph). Early on 11 January, the JTWC designated Laurence as 05S and initiated warnings on the cyclone with 1-minute windspeeds equivalent to a tropical depression. Later that day TCWC Darwin, reported that Laurence had weakened below cyclone intensity under the influence of vertical wind shear from low-level easterlies while the JTWC reported that Laurence had reached its 1-minute peak intensity of 65 km/h (40 mph). The JTWC kept Laurence at its peak intensity until 2000 WST (1200 UTC) the next day when they reported that the cyclone had become equivalent to a tropical depression. Laurence's remnants moved west over the next few days before dissipating near Rowley Shoals early on 16 December.

Severe Tropical Cyclone Joy 

On 17 December, TCWC Brisbane started to monitor a tropical low that had moved into the basin from the South Pacific.
Beginning 24 December 1990, the outer bands of Cyclone Joy reached Queensland, Australia. The storm killed 5 people and caused extensive flooding. Joy reached Category 4 intensity off the coast of Cairns on 24 December 1990, before crossing the coast to the North of Townsville, on 26 December 1990. The remnants of Joy created a convergence zone along the central Queensland coast, with many locations around the Mackay region recording over 2000 mm of rain during the following week.

Tropical Cyclone Chris 

 Chris, 15 to 21 February 1991, off Western Australia

Tropical Cyclone Daphne 

 Daphne, 21 to 28 February 1991, Pacific Ocean, then crossed Australia to Indian Ocean

Tropical Cyclone Kelvin 

 Kelvin, 24 February to 5 March 1991, Pacific Ocean

Tropical Cyclone Elma 

 Elma, 26 February to 5 March 1991, Indian Ocean

Tropical Depression Fatima

Severe Tropical Cyclone Errol 

Cyclone Errol formed on 23 March 1991 and never hit land. The storm was responsible for a sinking of an Indonesian fishing boat.

Severe Tropical Cyclone Marian 

Severe tropical cyclone Marian was first evident as a middle-level depression over the western Arafura Sea. In response to a southeasterly surge and a weaker monsoonal surge, it intensified to cyclone strength about 110 km south of Timor, under a divergent upper northeasterly wind regime. Its initial development may have been inhibited by restrictions to its low-level inflow caused by the mountains of Timor to its north. Once clear of this barrier, the cyclone intensified rapidly as it continued to move west-southwest, under the influence of a subtropical high over Australia. It moved slowly and erratically between 13 and 16 April as a new middle-level ridge developed to its west. Its peak estimated intensity of 930 hPa was reached during this period and weakening commenced as vertical shear increased across the system. For a period of about one day, commencing 1000, 13 April, Tropical Cyclone Watch advices were issued for parts of the Pilbara and Kimberley coastline. These advices were cancelled when the shearing process become apparent. Marian weakened further as its remnants drifted southwest before being absorbed into the circulation associated with cyclone Fifi.

Tropical Cyclone Fifi 

A severe cyclone, Fifi struck Western Australia in mid April 1991. The storm killed 29 people and left 100,000 homes without power.

Tropical Cyclone Lisa 

During 7 May, the BoM and the JTWC started to monitor a Tropical Low that had developed, along the South Pacific Convergence Zone near the island of Bouganville. During that day the low moved southwards and acquired the characteristics of a tropical cyclone, before it was named Lisa by TCWC Brisbane early the next day, after it had developed into a Category 1 tropical cyclone on the Australian scale. During that day the system continued to intensify as it moved towards the south-southwest across the axis of a ridge of high pressure towards a strong subtropical jet stream before it recurved and started to move towards the southeast during 9 May. During 9 May, the BoM reported that Lisa had become a category 2 tropical cyclone, before the system peaked with 10-minute sustained windspeeds of  during the next day. The JTWC also reported during 10 May, that Lisa had peaked with 1-minute sustained winds of ), which made it equivalent to a category 1 hurricane on the SSHWS. After it had peaked in intensity, Lisa encountered strong vertical windshear and started to gradually weaken during 11 May, as it moved out of the Australian region with TCWC Brisbane passing the primary warning responsibility for Lisa to the FMS. There was no reports of any significant damage associated with Lisa in either Papua New Guinea, the Solomon Islands or Vanuatu.

Other systems 
Over the next couple of days the system moved towards the south-west, before it moved into the Australian region during 5 March. Over the next couple of days the system moved towards the south-east before the JTWC designated the system 16P, and initiated advisories on it during 18 March after it had moved into the South Pacific basin. Over the next couple of days the system moved towards the south-southeast before it turned towards the southwest and passed over New Caledonia on 20 March, before it was last noted during the next day as it moved back into the Australian region.

Season effects 

|-
| Laurence ||  || bgcolor=#| || bgcolor=#| || bgcolor=#| || None ||  ||  ||
|-
| Joy || 17 – 27 December || bgcolor=#|Category 4 severe tropical cyclone || bgcolor=#|165 km/h (100 mph) || bgcolor=#| || Queensland || 63.84 || 6 ||
|-
| Chris ||  || bgcolor=#|Category 2 tropical cyclone || bgcolor=#| || bgcolor=#| || Western Australia ||  ||  ||
|-
| Daphne ||  || bgcolor=#|Category 2 tropical cyclone || bgcolor=#| || bgcolor=#| || Northern Australia ||  ||  ||
|-
| Kelvin || 24 February – 5 March || bgcolor=#|Category 2 tropical cyclone || bgcolor=#| || bgcolor=#|  || None ||  ||  ||
|-
| Elma ||  || bgcolor=#|Category 2 tropical cyclone || bgcolor=#| || bgcolor=#| || Queensland ||  ||  ||
|-
| 15P || 5 – 7 March || bgcolor=#|Tropical depression || bgcolor=#|55 km/h (35 mph) || bgcolor=#|1000 hPa (29.53 inHg) || None ||  ||  ||
|-
| 16P || 16 – 21 March || bgcolor=#|Tropical depression || bgcolor=#|55 km/h (35 mph) || bgcolor=#|1000 hPa (29.53 inHg) || None ||  ||  ||
|-
| Errol || 23 – 31 March || bgcolor=#|Category 4 severe tropical cyclone || bgcolor=#|175 km/h (110 mph) || bgcolor=#|950 hPa (28.05 inHg) || None ||  || 21 ||
|-
| Marian || 9 – 19 April || bgcolor=#|Category 4 severe tropical cyclone || bgcolor=#|210 km/h (130 mph) || bgcolor=#|930 hPa (27.46 inHg) || None ||  ||  ||
|-
| Fifi ||  || bgcolor=#|Category 2 tropical cyclone || bgcolor=#| || bgcolor=#| || Western Australia ||  ||  ||
|-
| Lisa ||  || bgcolor=#|Category 2 tropical cyclone || bgcolor=#| || bgcolor=#| || Papua New Guinea, Solomon Islands Vanuatu ||  ||  ||
|-

See also 

 List of Southern Hemisphere tropical cyclone seasons

Tropical cyclones in 1990 and 1991
 Atlantic hurricane seasons: 1990, 1991
 Pacific hurricane seasons: 1990, 1991
 Pacific typhoon seasons: 1990, 1991
 North Indian Ocean cyclone seasons: 1990, 1991

References 

 
Australian region cyclone seasons
Articles which contain graphical timelines